Soalara or Soalara Sud is a town and commune in Madagascar. It belongs to the district of Toliara II, which is a part of Atsimo-Andrefana Region. The population of the commune was estimated to be approximately 7774 in 2006.

Soalara is served by a local airport and riverine harbour. Primary and junior level secondary education are available in town. The majority 60% of the population works in fishing. 15% are farmers, while an additional 20% receives their livelihood from raising livestock. The most important crop is cassava, while other important products are sweet potatoes and cowpeas.  Services provide employment for 5% of the population.

Infrastructure
There is none. The infrastructure of this town can be called a disaster: there is no post-office, no water supplies, no electricity, no hospital. The harbor has fallen into pieces. Ferry: none. And its airport?  Just forget it ! Access by route to the next point of civilisation: 300km (unpaved).

3 radio stations can be received and there are 3 shops.

Communes
Soalara Sud
Number of fokontany (villages): 07
Name of the fokontany (villages) : Soalara Haut, Soalara Bas, Marovale, Sirafaly, Ankilimnivony, Andranotohoke, Ambahevahe

References and notes 

Populated places in Atsimo-Andrefana